The Little Red River Cree Nation is a First Nations band government in northern Alberta, headquartered at John D'Or Prairie.

Indian Reserves
There are three Indian Reserves under the governance of the band:
Fox Lake Indian Reserve 162 10438.30 ha
Garden Creek Indian Settlement 3741 ha.
John D'Or Prairie 215 14034 ha.

Nearby is the Wood Buffalo National Park. In the early 21st century, the Cree are concerned because the bison population has declined, and they have continued to depend on the animal as a food source. They believe that the government has not sufficiently protected the bison, and that too many non-Aboriginal hunters and poachers have taken too many bison as trophies, decimating the herd.

References

External links
Little Red River Cree Nation homepage

Cree governments
First Nations governments in Alberta